Masayuki Kawamura (born 15 March 1967) is a Japanese professional golfer.

Kawamura played on the Japan Golf Tour, winning three times.

Professional wins (8)

Japan Golf Tour wins (3)

*Note: The 1999 Descente Classic Munsingwear Cup was shortened to 54 holes due to weather.

Japan Golf Tour playoff record (1–1)

Japan Challenge Tour wins (1)

Other wins (3)
1992 Chushikoku Open
2009 Chushikoku Open
2012 Chushikoku Open

Japan PGA Senior Tour wins (1)
2020 Kanehide Senior Okinawa Open Golf Tournament

Team appearances
World Cup (representing Japan): 1994

External links

Japanese male golfers
Japan Golf Tour golfers
Sportspeople from Hiroshima Prefecture
1967 births
Living people